Gerber Singles was a failed product from 1974 by Gerber, a maker of baby food. It was food in glass jars targeted to college students and adults living on their own for the first time.  One marketing tag line was "We were good for you then, we're good for you now."  According to Business Insider, Gerber believed that there was a market for single serving, ready to eat foods similar to ready-made baby food. Hoping that college students and other adults would purchase such foods if they were not labeled as "baby food" Gerber developed the Singles product. The fatal flaw and the reason the product flopped is that "packages of meat mush didn't exactly scream 'cool' to young singles." In January 2012, an ABC show called Culture Click, called television's first modern-day social studies class, put it on the top ten failed ideas along with New Coke and Bic disposable underwear.

See also
 List of defunct consumer brands

References 

Canned food
Defunct consumer brands